Kurowskybob 'Black Panther' Fertil-Pierre (born August 28, 2002), known as Kurowskybob Pierre or Bobby Pierre, is an American soccer player who plays as a defender for Real Monarchs in MLS Next Pro. Internationally, in official matches, he has played for the Haiti national under-17 team.

Club career
A member of the academy of Real Salt Lake, Pierre made his professional debut on September 21, 2019 for their USL Championship affiliate Real Monarchs by going the distance in a start against Rio Grande Valley FC.

After playing in France for Strasbourg, Pierre returned to Real Monarchs on February 4, 2022, ahead of their inaugural season in MLS Next Pro.

International career
Pierre is eligible for the United States and Haiti, having been born and raised in the U.S. and of Haitian descent through his Father. In 2019, he played eight total matches for Haiti U17 in the 2019 CONCACAF U-17 Championship and 2019 FIFA U-17 World Cup. On January 8, 2020, he was called up for the first time to United States U20 for their January friendlies.

Career statistics

Club

Notes

References

External links
 

2002 births
Living people
Sportspeople from Fort Lauderdale, Florida
Soccer players from Florida
American soccer players
United States men's youth international soccer players
Haitian footballers
Haiti youth international footballers
Citizens of Haiti through descent
Association football defenders
Haitian expatriate footballers
Haitian expatriate sportspeople in France
Expatriate footballers in France
Real Salt Lake players
Real Monarchs players
USL Championship players
MLS Next Pro players
African-American soccer players
American sportspeople of Haitian descent
American expatriate soccer players
American expatriate sportspeople in France
21st-century African-American sportspeople